Pavilhão 28 de Fevereiro is the Arena of Angolan side Interclube, mainly used for its Men's and Women's basketball teams. The arena is located at D. Manuel I street, Behind the fire brigade. The arena is named after Interclube's founding date.

References

Indoor arenas in Angola